The Ottawa Fat Cats were a semi-professional baseball club in Ottawa, Ontario, Canada. The team began play on May 8, 2010, against the Guelph Royals, and played its home games at the Ottawa Baseball Stadium, the first home game was on May 15, 2010, against the Mississauga Twins. The team was a member of the Intercounty Baseball League but suspended operations at the end of the 2012 season.  They were eventually replaced as the primary tenant of what is now RCGT Park by the Ottawa Champions of the Can-Am League.

Founding
The Ottawa Stadium Group first became involved in operating a baseball team in 2009. With the Ottawa Baseball Stadium vacant, a city asset was unused. City Councillor Bob Monette arranged some community baseball games, and around the same time the OSG showed some interest in starting another Can-Am baseball team at the stadium. In January 2010, the group instead applied to the Intercounty Baseball League and was accepted. As the other eight IBL teams are located in or within a short distance of Toronto, the Fat Cats had to accept conditions whereby the Cats would pay for accommodations for the visiting teams and also arrange the schedule to allow the other teams to play back-to-back games in Ottawa. In March 2010, the group named Duncan MacDonald as the general manager, while Bill Mackenzie, a former professional baseball player, was hired as manager of the team.

The name and logo of the team were announced at a news conference on March 24, 2010. The name 'Fat Cats' was chosen to poke fun at the public image of federal public servants employed in the city. The Cats used the traditional red, black and white used by Ottawa teams. The cap logo is a stylized 'O' (similar to the alternate logo used by the city's NHL team, the Ottawa Senators), with horizontal black, red and white stripes through the 'O'. A vertical slit in the middle of the 'O' made it look like a cat's eye. The jersey logo was a cartoon cat with the team name written below it. The Cats also arranged concerts at the Stadium in addition to the ball games. The concerts' premise was to raise funds to offset any losses in the operations of the baseball team.

2010 New Era All-Star Classic

On August 12, it was announced that Ottawa would be the location for the first annual New Era All-Star Classic which features the best of the Intercounty Baseball League facing off in a four-game series against the best of the Ligue de Baseball Senior Élite du Québec (LBSEQ). Games 1 and 2 were held in Ottawa on August 21 and 22 2010, while the series continued in Thetford Mines, Quebec September 4 and 5.

Results

2010 season

In their first season the Fat Cats won 11 and lost 25, finished in last place and did not make the playoffs.

2011 Season

Their second season was a great success, finishing with 16 wins and 18 losses during the regular season, good for 6th place, but winning 9 and losing 5 during the playoff, reaching the finals and losing to the champion Brantford Red Sox.

2012 Season

The Fat Cats final season saw them finish with an 18 and 18 record, good for a 5th place tie for the last playoff spot, but they bowed out in the first round in 6 games.

Season-by-season records

Attendance

2010 season

In their first season in Ottawa, the Fat Cats did very well in attendance.  They averaged 2,328 per game for a total of 25,611 on the season despite playing many doubleheaders and having the fewest openings compared to any other team.

2011 Season
The Ottawa Fat Cats made it into The IBL finals only to lose to the Brantford Rex Sox. The Fat Cats however drew a total of 38,491 during the regular season, an increase of almost 50% from 2011. In the playoffs, the Fat Cats averaged 4,120 fans per game and drew a total of 28,843 in only seven games. The season total was 67,334 fans.

Final roster

See also
Ottawa Lynx, active 1993–2007
Ottawa Rapidz, active 2008
Ottawa Champions, active 2015–present

References

Baseball teams in Ontario
Fat
Defunct baseball teams in Canada
Intercounty Baseball League
Baseball teams established in 2010
Baseball teams disestablished in 2012
2010 establishments in Ontario
2012 disestablishments in Ontario